The title of Duc de Lauzun was a French peerage created in 1692 for Antoine Nompar de Caumont under influence of Mary of Modena. All dukes were marshals of France or renowned generals.

Ducs de Lauzun 
 Antoine Nompar de Caumont (1632–1723)
 Charles Armand de Gontaut (1663–1756), husband of Marie Antoinette De Bautru de Nogent, daughter of Antoine's only sister Diane Charlotte
 Louis Antoine de Gontaut (1700–1788), son
 Armand Louis de Gontaut (1747–1793), nephew

References 

 
Mary of Modena